The British Rail Class 207 (3D) diesel-electric multiple units were built by BR at Eastleigh in 1962. The fleet had a lifespan of 42 years.  The Southern Region class 201 to 207 DEMUs are nicknamed 'Thumpers' due to the noise their engine units make.

Operational history

Other routes that the units operated included occasional workings on the Marshlink Line, the Three Bridges to Tunbridge Wells Central Line and the Cuckoo Line. Most units were withdrawn in 1987 following the electrification of the Oxted Line's  branch. The final three units were withdrawn in August 2004.

Technical details
Power car (one per set)
 Introduced: 1962
 Weight: 
 Transmission: Electric, two English Electric type EE507 traction motors rated at  each.
 Maximum tractive effort: 
 Driving wheel diameter: 
 Coupling code: Standard 'Buck eye' compatible with contemporary Class 20x and 4xx units.
 Train heating: Electric

Preservation

Three complete units have been preserved:
207017 – Spa Valley Railway (3-car unit)
207202 – Formerly owned by Coulsdon Old Vehicle & Engineering Society, Bicester (2-car unit numbered 1305); purchased by and moved to the Bluebell Railway in January 2023.
207203 – Swindon and Cricklade Railway (2-car unit) –  DMBSO 60127 damaged by fire on 20 May 2016. Class 205 DTCsoL 60822 will be added to replace DTSO destroyed by fire. This vehicle had been stored at Pershore (ex unit 1123) and arrived at the Swindon & Cricklade Railway on 17 June 2016. TS 60669 (ex unit 1124) also stored at Pershore arrived at the same time and will be stripped of usable spares to restore 60822.
In addition, driving motor vehicle from unit 207013 has also been preserved:
207013 – DMBSO 60138 (cab only) – Reduced to just a cab in May 2016 and remaining section at the South Wales Cab Preservation Group.
The centre trailer from unit 207203 has been at a private location:
207203 – TSOL 70547 – Private site, Hungerford

DTSO 60901 from 207203 was preserved until it was destroyed in an arson attack on 20 May 2016.

Fleet details

Unrefurbished Class 207/0

Refurbished Class 207/1

Refurbished Class 207/2

Departmental Units

References

Further reading

207
Diesel electric multiple units
Train-related introductions in 1962